Florida Coastal Airlines (FCA) was an airline based in Fort Lauderdale, Florida, USA. It operated services between Florida and the Bahamas, Cuba, and Haiti.

History 
The airline was formed in 1995, operating with Cessna 402C aircraft.  In 2006, operations ceased, but quickly resumed. After flights restarted, the airline dropped their service to destinations within Florida, and operated exclusively to the Bahamas.  It has subsequently expanded to serve Cap-Haïtien, Haiti, the Guantanamo Bay Naval Base in Cuba, as well as five destinations in the Bahamas.

Destinations
Florida Coastal Airlines served the following destinations:
Fort Lauderdale International Airport, Fort Lauderdale, United States (hub)
Cap-Haitien International Airport, Cap-Haïtien, Haiti
Congo Town Airport, South Andros, Bahamas
South Bimini Airport, Bimini, Bahamas
North Eleuthera Airport, Eleuthera, Bahamas
Governor's Harbour Airport, Eleuthera, Bahamas
New Bight Airport, Cat Island, Bahamas
Guantanamo Bay Naval Base, Cuba

Fleet 
Florida Coastal Airline's fleet consisted of the following aircraft (as of May 2010):
2 Cessna 402Cs
1 Fairchild Swearingen Metro III
1 Fairchild Swearingen Metro IIB
3 Saab 340As

See also 
 List of defunct airlines of the United States

References

External links
Florida Coastal Airlines 
Sunshine Skies

Defunct airlines of the United States
Companies based in Fort Lauderdale, Florida
Airlines based in Florida
Airlines established in 1995
Airlines disestablished in 2010